Moventas is a Finnish company manufacturing mechanical power transmission equipment and providing after sales service for the renewable energy industry. Moventas is part of the Santasalo Moventas Group, owned by the global industrial engineering firm Clyde Blowers Capital, based in East Kilbride, Scotland.

Moventas' roots are in Valmet Power Transmission and Santasalo Gears. Between 2001 and 2005, the company was a part of Metso Corporation and called Metso Drives.

Moventas gearboxes have been used in wind turbines since the 1980s, and its installed base is some 13,000 units globally. Moventas also works closely with marine tidal turbine OEMs. Moventas provides after sales service to its own as well as third party gearboxes of almost any brand.

Moventas has wind gearbox manufacturing in Finland and assembly facilities in the UK (DB Wind UK) and North America, as well as service centres around the world. Moventas is headquartered in Jyväskylä, Central Finland.

References

Manufacturing companies of Finland